Mohammad Riz (also Romanized as Moḩammad Rīz; also known as Mamrīz) is a village in Tasuj Rural District, Shonbeh and Tasuj District, Dashti County, Bushehr Province, Iran. At the 2006 census, its population was 29, in 5 families.

References 

Populated places in Dashti County